Siak Sri Indrapura Palace or Siak Palace ( or  or ) is an istana (royal palace) of the Sultanate of Siak Sri Indrapura that is located at Siak Regency, Riau, on the island of Sumatra, Indonesia. The palace is now transformed into a museum.

The palace complex has an area of about 32,000 square meters consisting of 4 palaces namely Istana Siak, Istana Lima, Istana Padjang, and Istana Baru. Each of the palace including Siak Palace itself has an area of 1,000 square meters.

History
The Moorish-style palace, which is now a museum located 120 kilometres (75 mi) upstream of the Siak river in Pekanbaru was built by the 11th sultan, Syarif Hasyim Abdul Jalil Syarifuddin of Sultanate of Siak Sri Indrapura in 1889. The architecture of the palace has European influences that blend harmoniously with the Malay and Moorish elements. Before constructing the palace the Sultan traveled Netherlands and Germany, even some of the furniture was brought from Europe. 

There is a myth related with the  foundation. It is said that while the Sultan and his dignitaries were discussing the project, suddenly appeared a white dragon on the surface of the river Siak. The presence of the dragon was interpreted as a sign of blessing of the project and auspicious for the greatness of the kingdom. To immortalize the dragon, the Sultan made it the official emblem of the kingdom. The pillars of the palace were decorated with ornaments in the form of dragons.

The palace contains royal ceremonial objects, such as a gold-plated crown set with diamonds, a golden throne and personal objects of Sultan Syarif Qasyim and his wife, such as the "Komet", a multi-centennial musical instrument which is said to have been made only two copies in the world. Komet still works, and is used to play works by composers such as Beethoven, Mozart and Strauss.

Siak Palace has Malay, Arabic and European architecture. The building consists of two floors. The lower floor is divided into six courtrooms: The guest lounge, the living room of honor, the male living room, the living room for women, one room on the right is the courtroom, also used for the party room. The upper floor is divided into nine rooms, serves to rest the Sultan as well as the guests of the palace. At the top of the building there are six eagle statues as a symbol of courage. While on the court yard can still be seen eight cannons spread to various sides of the palace yard, then on the left rear of the palace there is a small building that was used as a temporary prison . A courtroom, the "Balairung Sari" (the flower room) and royal cemetery also part of palace complex.

See also
List of museums and cultural institutions in Indonesia
About the Siak Sri Indrapura Palace and his history (only in indonesian)

Reference 

Palaces in Indonesia
Museums in Riau
Tourist attractions in Indonesia
Tourist attractions in Riau